Give Us Sugar is the 2-CD compilation album released in 2009 by the alternative rock band Black Lab. It is a collection of assorted rarities from throughout their career, including non-LP B-sides and songs previously exclusive to movie soundtracks. It was intended to be released as a limited edition of only 250 sequentially numbered autographed copies, but the number of pre-orders far surpassed that limit, forcing the band to change the publishing and distribution approach. The hand written numbering on the CD front covers still stated the edition number as one of /250 (e.g.: 519/250), and the exact number produced is not known.

CD 1 Track listing
"Underground"
"Horses"
"Black Eye"
"Keep Myself Awake"
"Good Day"
"Tell Me What to Say"
"The Moon"
"Hole in the Sky"
"Sugar"
"Free"
"Gone Away"
"Lucky"
"Not Too Late"
"Head on a Skate"
"Rock Star"
"I am a DJ" (Live)

CD 2 Track listing
"Like I Used To"
"Mexican Sand"
"Your Body as a Marker"
"Good Life"
"Philadelphia"
"Lust"
"Call"
"Play With Fire"
"Tell Me Why" (Demo)
"See The Sun" (Demo)
"Perfect Girl" (Demo)
"Circus Lights" (Demo)
"Come On"
"What Child is This"
"Body of an Angel"
"Gates of the Country" (Acoustic)

2009 albums
Black Lab albums